Bloodlust! is a 1961 American horror thriller film written, directed and produced by Ralph Brooke and starring Wilton Graff, June Kenney, Joan Lora, Eugene Persson, and Robert Reed. It is  based on Richard Connell's 1924 short story "The Most Dangerous Game." It was produced by Robert H. Bagley. Its plot follows four young adults who visit a tropical island only to become prey for a sadistic hunter. It was filmed in 1959 but not released until 1961, when it was the second film on a double feature with The Devil's Hand.

Plot
Two couples- Betty and Johnny, and Jeanne and Pete -are vacationing at sea together. When the ship's captain passes out drunk, they decide to go to a nearby jungle island. As they depart, Capt. Tony awakens and calls out, warning them not to.

As they explore the island, Johnny falls into a pit. The others start pulling him out but look up to see Dr. Balleau and two servants. Balleau orders the servants to help get Johnny out.

That night at his house, Balleau tells them that he moved to the island "after the war" to indulge his passion for hunting. The couples want to leave, but Balleau says they can not because wild animals prowl the jungle. Ballaeu makes his wife Sandra show Betty and Jeanne to the guestroom, while Balleau's servant Jondor escorts Johnny and Pete to their room.

A bit later, lovers Sandra and houseguest Dean Gerard discuss Dean's latest plan for their escape. Meanwhile, Johnny and Pete go to Betty and Jeanne's room to talk about their situation. They decide to poke about the house, but Sandra and Dean stop Betty and Johnny, taking them back to the guestroom. Jeanne and Pete find a tunnel. They hide as a servant walks into a room. When he leaves, Jeanne and Pete go in and discover a vat of bubbling acid. They hide again when the servant returns and are horrified when he reveals a woman's body floating in an aquarium. The servant leaves again. Jeanne and Pete go back to the guestroom to tell the others what they have seen.

Dean tells them his escape plan. He and Sandra will slip out of the house, steal a boat, go to the mainland and then come back with help. But as they sneak through the front gate, Balleau, toting a spear, follows.

Two days pass. No one has seen Balleau or heard from Sandra and Dean. As Betty and Johnny discuss this, a servant enters the room. They hide as the servant walks through a secret door. When he comes out, they go in. There they discover Balleau and his "trophies"- the mounted bodies of people he has hunted, Sandra and Dean among them. Balleau explains to Betty and Johnny that he was a sniper during the war. At first, he detested sniping, he says, but then began to enjoy it, and soon the enjoyment "turned into a lust - a lust for blood!"

As Balleau tells both couples that he will hunt Johnny and Pete, Jondor comes in dragging Capt. Tony behind him. Balleau adds Tony to the hunt for failing to bring Balleau sufficient inmates from the "penal island." Balleau says he will hunt only the three men. Betty and Jeanne will stay with him, and now that Sandra is dead, he is "looking forward to getting to know [them] better ... much better."

Jondor locks the girls in the guestroom. Balleau says that he will carry a crossbow and only three arrows, one for each man. To make things more "sporting", he tosses Tony a pistol and says they will find ammunition in the "Tree of Death." But they find just one bullet. Tony runs off with it, leaving Johnny and Pete to fend for themselves. When Tony attempts to shoot Balleau, the gun will not fire. Balleau has removed the firing pin. He kills Tony.

After escaping from the guestroom, Betty and Jeanne enter the tunnel Pete and Jeanne had found earlier. They go into the room with a vat of acid, hoping to arm themselves with knives, but a servant comes in. He and Betty tussle. Betty, the daughter of a judo expert, judo-flips the servant into the acid, where he dissolves, screaming in agony.

The girls head into the jungle, looking for Johnny and Pete. Balleau and Jondor are still hunting the boys when Jondor falls into a leech-filled pond. Balleau leaves him to drown. Betty and Jeanne find Johnny and Pete. They head for Balleau's house, planning to use his rifles against him. They find rifles but no ammunition. They are defenseless.

Balleau finds the couples hiding in his trophy room. Holding them at gunpoint, he poses them in the tableau they will be in after killing them. Suddenly, Jondor bursts in, covered with leeches. Jondor grips Balleau in a bear hug and, as Balleau screams, impales him on a row of spikes, killing him.

Cast 
 Wilton Graff as Dr. Albert Balleau
 June Kenney as Betty Scott (credited as June Kenny)
 Walter Brooke as Dean Gerard
 Robert Reed as Johnny Randall
 Eugene Persson as Pete Garwood (credited as Gene Persson)
 Joan Lora as Jeanne Perry
 Troy Patterson as Capt. Tony
 Lilyan Chauvin as Sandra Balleau
 Bobby Hall as Jondor
 Bill Coontz as insane man in the jungle
 Harry Wilson as a trophy (uncredited)

Production 
Bloodlust! is an adaptation of Richard Connell's short story "The Most Dangerous Game", first published in Collier's magazine in 1924. Versions of the story have been made as theatrical films, shorts and made-for-television movies at least 17 times between 1932 and 2016.

Bloodlust! was filmed in 1959 at Screencraft Studios in Hollywood by Cinegraf Productions, but it was not released by Crown International Pictures until 13 September 1961, when it premiered in San Diego, California, on a double bill with The Devil's Hand. The film was distributed by Astral Films in Canada in 1963 and was also released in Mexico and the Soviet Union, although at unspecified dates.

Lilyann Chauvin's first name is misspelled "Lylyan" on both American and Mexican posters and lobby cards for the film. She and Graff share top billing on them despite her minor role in the movie.

Reception 
Critical reception of the movie was poor. In a review of its co-feature, The Devil's Hand, film critic Margaret Harford wrote just one succinct paragraph about Bloodlust!: "Wilton Graff, another veteran actor turned to villainy, plays a mad scientist in the companion feature. The title is 'Blood Lust.' which should be sufficient warning for anyone."

The anonymous reviewer in "Feature Reviews" in BoxOffice magazine's issue of 20 November 1961 had more to say, but nothing that was much better. He or she wrote that "little, if anything, is left to the individual viewer's imagination" in Bloodlust! and that star Graff "doesn't bring much conviction to the killer doctor part," while "the four young people ... emerge as one-dimensional actors." In summary, the reviewer said, "... this seems to let emotion-mad humans go on all out on a killing spree, and while the adventure-action audiences will find what's happening relatively engrossing, the discriminating won't be able to contain their bored feelings."

In a short review, British film critic Phil Hardy dismissed Bloodlust! as "a wretched misuse of the Richard Connell story" and called the Dr. Baleau character a "dismal pervert pursuing teenagers whose bodies he stores in glass tanks."

Bloodlust! could be mistaken for the similarly-titled Blood Lust, one of multiple English language titles of the 1977 West German film Moskito der Schänder (literally, Mosquito the Rapist). It and the 1970 American movie Blood Mania shared a "combo" poster of both movies that was used to promote a drive-in theatre double-feature. Both films carried R-ratings in the USA, which required people under age 17 to be accompanied by a parent or an adult guardian.

Television 
Bloodlust! was sold to TV in October 1963, about two years after its theatrical release, by Westhamtpon Features, a division of Desilu. It was part of a 41-film package which also included The Devil's Hand.

More recently, it was shown on Mystery Science Theater 3000 on 3 September 1994, in an episode which featured the first appearance of character Pearl Forrester as well as violin playing by Maria Bamford. On 9 January 2009 it was featured on The Schlocky Horror Picture Show and on 8 October 2010 was shown in "The Screaming Skull" episode of Cinemassacre's Monster Madness.

Home video
Bloodlust! has been in home release for a number of years and by at least 22 different distributors, as a single film or in sets of films. Madacy Entertainment was the first, putting the movie out on VHS and DVD in 2001. Reel Media Entertainment had a VHS tape in world-wide release in 2004, followed by Film Annex's world-wide release in all media in 2006. BAC Films distributed a DVD of the movie in France in 2006 and Elstree Entertainment released Bloodlust! on DVD in the UK in 2001.

See also
 List of American films of 1961
 Taxidermy

References

External links 

 
 
 
 

1961 films
1961 horror films
American black-and-white films
Crown International Pictures films
1960s English-language films
American independent films
1960s horror thriller films
Films based on short fiction
Films set on fictional islands
Films about death games
1961 directorial debut films
American horror thriller films
1961 independent films
1960s American films